The Best of the Outlaws: Green Grass and High Tides is a sixteen-track compilation album by American southern rock band Outlaws. It was released in 1996 and features all their major hits, including the Rock Band-featured southern rock epic "Green Grass and High Tides".

Track listing 
"There Goes Another Love Song" (Hughie Thomasson, Monte Yoho) - 3:05
"Knoxville Girl" (Henry Paul) - 3:31
"Song for You" (Bill Jones, Thomasson) - 3:32
"Waterhole" (Outlaws) - 2:05
"Green Grass and High Tides" (Thomasson) - 9:48
"Breaker Breaker" (Thomasson) - 2:57
"South Carolina" (Paul) - 3:04
"Freeborn Man" (Keith Allison, Mark Lindsay) - 4:49
"Prisoner" (Jones) - 3:57
"Girl from Ohio" (Paul) - 5:01
"Stick Around for Rock & Roll (Thomasson) - 6:37
"Hurry Sundown" (Thomasson) - 4:06
"Gunsmoke" (Paul, Yoho) - 4:19
"You Are the Show" (Thomasson) - 4:55
"Take It Any Way You Want It" (Jones, Thomasson) - 3:19
"(Ghost) Riders in the Sky" (Stan Jones) - 5:51

Production personnel 
Compilation producer – Al Quaglieri
Art direction – Andela Skouras
Reissue design – Satoshi Kobayashi
Original logo design – Jeanne Paul
Cover photography – John Gellman
Liner notes – Henry Paul and Hughie Thomasson
Mastered by Bob Irwin and Kip Smith at Sundazed Studios, Coxsackie, New York.

See also 
 Wanted! The Outlaws
 Outlaws (Outlaws album)

References 

Outlaws (band) albums
1996 compilation albums
Outlaws (band) members